Abdul Qader al-Najdi, also known as Abu Muaz al-Tikriti, was an Iraqi Islamic militant and the leader of the Islamic State of Iraq and the Levant in Libya. He was possibly killed in September 2020.

History
He is sometimes confused as being Saudi Arabian due to the 'al-Najdi' in his name (Najd being a region of Saudi Arabia), but he was an Iraqi from the city of Tikrit as indicated by his surname. He is not to be confused with Abu Habib al-Jazrawi, a deceased Saudi IS leader in Libya. 

He replaced Abu Nabil al-Anbari who was killed in November 2015. His appointment was announced in the IS newsletter al-Naba in March 2016.

The Libyan National Army (LNA) reported in September 2020 that during a raid in Sebha, it had killed the man who had led the Libyan branch of ISIS since 2015 who they identified as Abu Moaz al-Iraqi, also known as Abu Abdullah al-Iraqi.

References 

2020 deaths
Islamic State of Iraq and the Levant in Libya
Islamic State of Iraq and the Levant members from Iraq
Leaders of Islamic terror groups
Year of birth missing